Shah Temur (died 1358) was khan of the Chagatai Khanate for a period in 1358.

In 1358 ‘Abdullah, who had recently succeeded Qazaghan to the powerful position of amir of the ulus, executed his father’s puppet khan Bayan Quli and installed Shah Temur in his place. ‘Abd Allah’s position within the Chagatai ulus was weak, however, and in that same year two tribal leaders, Hajji Beg and Buyan Suldus, drove him from power. They then killed Shah Temur, as Buyan Suldus became amir of the ulus.

References

Manz, Beatrice Forbes, The Rise and Rule of Tamerlane. Cambridge University Press, 1989, .

1358 deaths
Chagatai khans
14th-century monarchs in Asia
Year of birth unknown